G. giganteus may refer to:
 Geosaurus giganteus, an extinct marine crocodyliform reptile species from Western Europe of the Late Jurassic
 Gigantopithecus giganteus, an extinct large ape species that lived in what is now India
 Gymnopilus giganteus, a mushroom species

Synonyms
 Gastrochilus giganteus, a synonym for Rhynchostylis gigantea, an orchid species